Tartu Medal is an award which is given out on 29 June (Tartu City Day) by Tartu City Government. The award was established in 2002.

Recipients
Recipients:
 2002: Kalle Kasemaa, Arvo Kivikas, Jaak Aaviksoo, Jaanus Harro, Mati Alaver, Anders Gunnar Bergström, Bertil Lindström, Margit Sepp
 2003: Aleksander Maastik, Külli Praakli, Sigrid Aru, Ulrich Mädge, John Winther, Peeter Tulviste
 2004: Allan Liim, Tiina Talvik, Jüri Samarütel, Erna Boston, Bengt Ingvar Bylund, Tiia Toomet, Nils Bernhard Sachris
 2005: Wilhelm Poser, Wolfgang Koch, Jaan Kross, Ela-Heigi Martis, Henning Kramer, Kaur Alttoa, Nils Hollberg
 2006: Ants Nilson, Irene Leisner, Hilja Sepp, Sirje Karis, Aino-Eevi Lukas, Aivar Mäe
 2007: John-Erik Thun and Per-Edvin Persson, Valve Lepik, Peeter Lokk, Kuno Jürjenson, Lennart Jõela
 2008: Tarmo Noop, Gunnar Hedberg, Jüri Talvet, Guido Arro, Valve Rehema, Vambola Raudsepp, Ain Nõmm, Lembit Lump
 2009: Valdur Tiit, Taavo Virkhaus, Reino Lemmetyinen
 2010: Jaak Kikas, Raivo Adlas, Vilma Trummal, Kalle Mesila, Endel Nõgene
 2011: Tõnis Mägi, Gunnar Rafn Sigurbjörnsson, Kari Kolehmainen, Ain Heinaru, Maido Madisson
 2012: Maire Breede and Vladimir Heerik, Timo Paavo Nieminen
 2013: Kenneth Holmstedt, Hiie Asser, Enno Tubli
 2014: Ene Ahven, Juta Nugin, Jüri Randjärv, Heiki Tamm, Anne Ormisson
 2015: Olga Einasto, Ülle Kuusik, Toomas Lepp, Jaanus Rooba, Ilona Smuškina
 2016: Valentina Frunze, Margo Külaots, Toivo Pilli, Enriko Talvistu, Johan Tralla
 2017: Liidia Konsa, Tatjana Ojavere, Ene Peiker, Anu Reinart and Andrus Tasa
 2018: Andres Gailit, Rein Lemberpuu, Riho Leppoja, Aili Michelson, Maria Rõõmusoks
 2019: Hele Kiisel, Merike Kull, Vallot Mangus, Vambola Niit, Raimonds Vējonis

References

Estonian awards
Tartu